The Guggenheim is a 20-story building in Rochester, Minnesota owned by Mayo Clinic. Many of the floors hold research labs. The building is connected to the subway system and physically conjoined with the Hilton Building. On the first floor there is a plaque for Philip Showalter Hench and Edward Calvin Kendall, the Mayo doctors who won a Nobel Prize for Physiology or Medicine.

See also
List of tallest buildings in Rochester, Minnesota

Mayo Clinic buildings
Skyscrapers in Rochester, Minnesota

Buildings and structures completed in 1974